Lucas Nahuel Rodríguez (born 27 September 1993) is an Argentine footballer who plays as a left-back for Independiente.

References

External links
 
 

1993 births
Living people
Argentine footballers
Argentine expatriate footballers
Argentina under-20 international footballers
Association football defenders
Argentinos Juniors footballers
C.D. Veracruz footballers
Club Atlético Tigre footballers
Club Atlético Independiente footballers
Argentine Primera División players
Primera Nacional players
Liga MX players
Argentine expatriate sportspeople in Mexico
Expatriate footballers in Mexico
Footballers from Buenos Aires